Puerto Rico Highway 118 (PR-118) is a rural road located between Lajas, Puerto Rico and San Germán. This road extends from PR-117 in Lajas Arriba and ends at PR-102 in Retiro.

Major intersections

See also

 List of highways numbered 118

References

External links
 

118